The Immediate Geographic Region of Teófilo Otoni is one of the 7 immediate geographic regions in the Intermediate Geographic Region of Teófilo Otoni, one of the 70 immediate geographic regions in the Brazilian state of Minas Gerais and one of the 509 of Brazil, created by the National Institute of Geography and Statistics (IBGE) in 2017.

Municipalities 
It comprises 27 municipalities.

 Ataléia     
 Campanário   
 Caraí    
 Carlos Chagas    
 Catuji  
 Franciscópolis    
 Frei Gaspar    
 Itaipé 
 Itambacuri  
 Itaobim   
 Ladainha  
 Malacacheta   
 Monte Formoso   
 Nanuque  
 Nova Módica   
 Novo Cruzeiro   
 Novo Oriente de Minas  
 Ouro Verde de Minas  
 Padre Paraíso   
 Pavão  
 Pescador   
 Ponto dos Volantes  
 Poté   
 São José do Divino     
 Serra dos Aimorés     
 Setubinha 
 Teófilo Otoni

See also  
List of Intermediate and Immediate Geographic Regions of Minas Gerais

References 

Geography of Minas Gerais